The College of Engineering Perumon (Entrance Commissioner's Code: PRN ) was started in 2000 under the Co-operative Academy of Professional Education ( CAPE Kerala ) Society. The society was formed to establish educational institutions to provide education and training, research and development, and consultancy. The society is promoted by the Co-operation Department of the government of Kerala and is an autonomous society.

The institution functions on a no-profit no-loss basis, a system upheld by the Supreme Court of India. The AICTE (All India Council for Technical Education) has given approval for the conduct of the courses. The state government has sanctioned five B.Tech degree courses.

Affiliated university 
The institution is affiliated to A P J Abdul Kalam Technological University .

Admission 
Admission is through Central Counseling by the Government of Kerala. Candidates are admitted based on the state-level Common Entrance Exam (KEAM) conducted by the C E E. From 2003, 50% of the seats are treated as Government seats, and the balance 35% as Management Quota. 15% of the seats are reserved for NRIs.

Courses 

The institution offers B.Tech courses in
 Computer Science & Engineering
 Electronics and Communication Engineering, NBA Accredited
 Electrical and Electronics Engineering, NBA Accredited
 Information Technology
 Mechanical Engineering

M.Tech course in 
 Computer and Information Science.
The duration of each B.Tech course is 4 years and the duration of M.Tech course is 2 Yrs.

Location 
The institution has 25 acres of land (10 hectares) as allotted by the government of Kerala on the banks of the Ashtamudi Lake. It is at Kuzhiyathu Junction along the Kollam - Perumon Road (via - Anchalummoodu) 12 km away from Kollam Railway Station /bus stand via NH 47. The nearest railway station is Perinad, Panayam at 1 km distance. The site is 78 km from Thiruvananthapuram Airport (nearest airport) and the Kochi Harbour is 165 km north.

Departments 

 Electronics and Communication Engineering
 Computer Science and Engineering
 Electrical and Electronics Engineering
 Information Technology
 Mechanical Engineering (Started recently; from 2011 - 2012 onwards)

The colleges started M.Tech course in Computer and Information Science in 2011.
The annual intake for each course is:
 Electronics and Communication Engineering - 126 seats
 Computer Science and Engineering - 63 seats
 Electrical and Electronics Engineering - 63 seats
 Information Technology - 63 seats
 Mechanical Engineering - 63 seats

Electronics and Communication Engineering Department(NBA Accredited) 
The laboratories under the Department of Electronics & Communication Engineering are :
 Electronic Circuits and Digital Laboratory
 Micro processor and Advanced Micro Processor Laboratory
 Communication and Microwave Laboratory
 Digital Signal Processing and Project Laboratory

Website of the Electronics and Communication Engineering Department: earnestcep.in

Electrical and Electronics Engineering Department(NBA Accredited) 
The department has the following laboratories:
 Basic Electrical Engineering Laboratory
 Electrical Machines Laboratory
 Electrical Measurements Laboratory
 Power Electronics Laboratory
 Advanced Electrical Engineering Laboratory.

Computer Science and Engineering Department 
The Computer Science and Engineering is equipped with the following laboratories:
 Programming Laboratory
 Internet Laboratory
 Hardware/Networking Laboratory
 Project Laboratory - 2
 PG and Research Lab

Website of the Computer Science and Engineering Department : ascicep.com

Information Technology Department 
The Department of Information Technology laboratories are :
 Systems and Application Laboratory
 Internet Laboratory
 Multimedia Laboratory.

Mechanical Engineering Department 
A B.Tech course in the discipline was started in 2011. The Block as well as the following laboratories under this department are in process of setting up.
 Fluid Mechanics Lab
 Hydraulic Machinery Lab
 Thermal Engineering Lab
 Metrology and Measurements Lab
 HMT Lab
 CAD-CAM Lab

Department Associations 

EARNEST is the Electronics and Communication Engineering Department student’s association (Electronics Association Rendering Newly Emerging Scientific Thoughts). It was formed to cultivate interest in science and technology among the students. It organizes technical seminars, paper presentations, and personality development programs.
ASCI is the Computer Science and Information Technology Department student’s association. It organizes lecturers, seminars and technical talks by faculty and visitors. It hosts short-term courses, workshops, exhibitions, quizzes, paper presentations, code debugging, and gaming.
DYUTHI is the Electrical and Electronics Engineering Department association. It organizes lecturers, seminars and technical talks by personalities. It hosts short term courses, workshops, exhibitions, and competitions. The association conducts industrial visits to such as KSEB, KMML, and KEL, enabling students to familiarize with procedures and engineering practices in the field.
TRAMS is the Mechanical Engineering Department Association (The Royal Association of Mechanical Students). TRAMS conducts seminars, technical expos and cultural expos. One of the ventures is named Auto psych : The Quilon Motor Show. The association conducts industrial visits to major mechanical industries like KMML, NTPC, IOCl, enabling students to familiarize with engineering practices.

Technical and non-technical organizations

National Service Scheme (NSS) 
The National Service Scheme (N.S.S) is a youth movement in the country. The scheme provides opportunities for teachers and students to gain experience of community service.

Indian Society for Technical Education 
The Indian Society for Technical Education (ISTE) is a national society for teachers and students of the technical education system. The objective of the ISTE is to assist and contribute to the production and development of professional engineers and technocrats. A student chapter of ISTE functions in the college. The chapter runs training programs, seminars, and talks, to enhance the professional knowledge of the student.

Institute of Electrical and Electronics Engineers (IEEE) 
The aim of the Institute of Electrical and Electronics Engineers (IEEE), USA, is to create an awareness in trainee engineers of technological innovations. A student chapter of IEEE in the college will be started in the college.

Clubs
 Music Club
 Arts Club
 Sports Club
 Literary Club
 Robotics Club
 Aerospace Interest Club

Facilities 
 Cricket ground
 Football ground
 Badminton court
 Volleyball court
 Canteen
 Stationery shop
 Central Library
 Gymnasium
 Parking

Parent Teacher Association (P.T.A.) 
The objectives of the PTA are:
  To work for the welfare of the students and the institution.
  To offer suggestions for the successful functioning of the college.
  To promote participation of the parents in the programs of the college and to establish better liaison with the teachers.
All parents/guardians of the students, and staff members, are members of the association. It is compulsory for a parent/guardian of a student on the rolls of the college to be a member of the PTA.

Anti-Ragging Squad 
Any type of ragging, teasing, torturing, or misbehavior to the junior students is strictly prohibited. Legal actions will be taken against those students who are found guilty. A team has been selected to eradicate ragging from the campus

Alumni Association 
The College of Engineering Perumon Alumni Association was formed in 2005. The association was inaugurated by Mrs. Kalavathi (General Manager, BSNL) on 22 August 2010.
The Association promotes interaction amongst the alumni, faculty and students.

See also 
 Cochin University of Science and Technology
 TKM College of Engineering
 College of Engineering Karunagappally
 List of colleges affiliated with CUSAT
 List of Engineering Colleges in Kerala
 A P J Abdul Kalam Technological University

References

External links 

 Official website 
 Facebook page 
 Samskara ( Literary Club - Facebook page )
 CAPE Kerala 
 Association of Computer Science And Information Technology ( ASCI - website )
 Electronics Association Rendering Newly Emerging Scientific Thoughts ( EARNEST - website )

Engineering colleges in Kollam district
Educational institutions established in 2000
2000 establishments in Kerala